King Floyd (February 13, 1945 – March 6, 2006) was a New Orleans soul singer and songwriter, best known for his top 10 hit from 1970, "Groove Me".

Early career
King Floyd III was born in New Orleans in 1945. His musical career started as a singer at the Sho-Bar on Bourbon Street. Following a stint in the army, Floyd went to California, where he joined up with record producer Harold Battiste. His debut album, A Man in Love, featuring songs co-written with Dr. John, failed to make an impact on the charts. Floyd returned to New Orleans in 1969 and worked for the Post Office.

Recording success
James Brown made a discovery out of King Floyd, because of the screams, tells, grunts, and other panting noises that were similar to Brown's vocal style. In 1970, Wardell Quezergue, an arranger of R&B scores, persuaded Floyd to record "Groove Me" with Malaco Records in Jackson, Mississippi. Jean Knight recorded her hit, "Mr. Big Stuff," in the same sessions.

At first, "Groove Me" was a B-side to another Floyd song, "What Our Love Needs." New Orleans radio DJs started playing "Groove Me" and the song became a local hit. Atlantic Records picked up national distribution of "Groove Me," which topped the United States R&B chart and reached number 6 on the Billboard Hot 100. This disc sold over one million copies, and received a gold disc awarded by the R.I.A.A. in December 1970. Floyd quit his job at the post office to perform a U.S. tour. His follow-up single, "Baby Let Me Kiss You" climbed up to number 29 on the Billboard top 40 charts in 1971.

However, differences with Quezergue soon emerged and his 1973 follow-up album, Think About It, failed to make a commercial impact. However, Atlantic released a song from the album, "Woman Don't Go Astray," as a single. His 1975 album, Well Done, was released through TK Records with Atlantic distributing. "I Feel Like Dynamite" from the album, written by Larry Hamilton, was released as its single. Reviewing the album in Christgau's Record Guide: Rock Albums of the Seventies (1981), Robert Christgau said, "Floyd's quiet, chocolatey voice—cf. Lee Dorsey, Aaron Neville—is prized by seekers after the New Orleans dispensation, but he's never grooved me without skipping like a cheap bootleg. So I'm pleased to report that side one of his fourth LP, climaxing with the neglected regional hit "I Feel Like Dynamite", provides songs as winsome as the straight-ahead Caribbeanisms (even some reggae) of the New Orleans R&B behind. Location of studio: Jackson, Mississippi."

Subsequent career
None of his subsequent songs achieved the same success, as disco dominated the charts for the remainder of the 1970s. However, Floyd had credits for "Boombastic," recorded in 1995 by Shaggy, which became a big hit. Floyd reunited with Malaco Records in 2000 for the Old Skool Funk album, but it failed to make an impact. However, his song "Don't Leave Me Lonely" was prominently sampled by the Wu-Tang Clan for the song "For Heaven's Sake" off their album Wu-Tang Forever.

Personal life
He died on March 6, 2006, from complications of a stroke and diabetes. He was survived by his wife, children, and grandchildren.

Discography

Studio albums

Singles

References

External links
 

1945 births
2006 deaths
Deaths from diabetes
Rhythm and blues musicians from New Orleans
Songwriters from Louisiana
Atlantic Records artists
Chess Records artists
20th-century American singers
Singers from Louisiana
20th-century American male singers
American male songwriters